Freedom Park is a memorial and leisure park area in the middle of downtown Lagos in Lagos Island, Nigeria which was formerly Her Majesty's Broad Street Prison. It was designed by the Architect Theo Lawson as a speculative project under the CIA-Lagos (formerly Creative Intelligence Agency and now Cultural Intellectual Association) in 1999.

The Park was constructed to preserve the history and cultural heritage of Nigerians.
Monuments in the park reveal the Lagos colonial heritage and history of Her Majesty's Broad Street prisons. It was built to commemorate the 50th anniversary independence celebration in October, 2010. The Park serves as a National Memorial, a Historical landmark, a Cultural site, Arts and Recreation centre.

The park, when it was a prison hosted some political activists who fought for Nigeria's independence.

The park, which is now a serene abode for individuals, visitors' collective contemplation and interaction is open to the public every day. Today, freedom park has become a venue for diverse social events and recreational entertainment.

History
Broad Street Prison was established after Britain made Lagos a Colony in 1861 (see Lagos Treaty of Cession). The initial prison structure was built in 1882 with mud walls and grass thatch but did not last long because of sabotage from colonial government opponents. According to Theo Lawson, architect of Freedom Park, opponents of British colonialism in Lagos "kept throwing fire into it and setting it ablaze and so then in 1885 the colonial government imported bricks from England and rebuilt the prison". The colonial government's expense on the prison in 1882 (£16,000) revealed the government's priority on law and order versus other initiatives such as education which the government spent  £700 on. The Colonial report for 1898 indicates that 676 males, 26 females, and 11 juveniles were imprisoned at Broad Street prison for the year.

Broad Street Prison was pulled down in 1979 and was reduced to a dumping ground until the 1990s when plans were drawn up to transform the site into a creative space.

Notable prisoners at Broad Street Prison
Herbert Macaulay
Anthony Enahoro
Obafemi Awolowo
Michael Imoudu

Gallery

References

 Fastlagos review on Freedom Park. Freedom Park is an arts and recreation center located on what used to be a colonial prison in Lagos
 Freedom Park. Folu Oyefeso. Retrieved 4 September 2020.

External links
 
 https://www.foluoyefeso.com/post/freedom-park

Parks in Lagos
Museums in Lagos
Monuments and memorials in Lagos
Lagos Island
Landmarks in Lagos
Protected areas of Lagos
Prisons in Nigeria
History of Lagos
Historic buildings and structures in Nigeria
2010 establishments in Nigeria
Protected areas established in 2010
Parks in Nigeria
Nature parks in Nigeria